Vicente Gil Ros (born 5 January 1976) is an S5 swimmer from Spain.

Personal 
Gil was born 5 January 1976 in Carpesa, Valencia.

Swimming 
Gil is an S5 swimmer.

In 2010, Gil raced at the Tenerife International Open.  He raced at the 2011 IPC European Swimming Championships in Berlin, Germany. In March 2013, he participated in a dualathlon  event as part of a relay team, with Fátima Sánchez Marrero his teammate.

Paralympics 
Gil competed at the  2000 Summer Paralympics, 2004 Summer Paralympics, 2008 Summer Paralympics and 2012 Summer Paralympics. He earned a silver medal at the 2004 and 2008 Games in the SB3 50 meter breaststroke.  He won a bronze medal in the 4 x 50 meter 20 Points medley race at the 2008 Games.

References

External links 
 
 

1976 births
Living people
Spanish male breaststroke swimmers
Paralympic swimmers of Spain
Paralympic gold medalists for Spain
Paralympic silver medalists for Spain
Paralympic bronze medalists for Spain
Paralympic medalists in swimming
S5-classified Paralympic swimmers
Swimmers at the 2000 Summer Paralympics
Swimmers at the 2004 Summer Paralympics
Swimmers at the 2008 Summer Paralympics
Swimmers at the 2012 Summer Paralympics
Swimmers at the 2016 Summer Paralympics
Medalists at the 2000 Summer Paralympics
Medalists at the 2004 Summer Paralympics
Medalists at the 2008 Summer Paralympics
Sportspeople from Valencia